Kiliwa, alternate Names: Kiliwi, Ko’lew or Quiligua (in Kiliwa: Ko'leeu Nyaha) is a Yuman language spoken in Baja California, in the far northwest of Mexico, by the Kiliwa people.

76 people reported their language as Kiliwa in a 2020 census.
However, a count in 2018 found only 4 speakers remaining.

History
The Kiliwa language was extensively studied by Mauricio J. Mixco, who published Kiliwa texts as well as a dictionary and studies of syntax.

As recently as the mid-1900s, Mixco reported that members of the native community universally spoke Kiliwa as their first language, with many Kiliwas also bilingual in Paipai. At the start of the twenty-first century, Kiliwa is still spoken; a 2000 census reported 52 speakers. However, the language is considered to be in danger of extinction.

Kiliwa is a language of the Yuman Family Language Summit, held annually since 2001.

Classification
Kiliwa is the southernmost representative of the Yuman family, and the one that is most distinct from the remaining languages, which constitute Core Yuman. The Kiliwa's neighbors to the south, the Cochimí, spoke a language or a family of languages that was probably closely related to but not within the Yuman family. Consequently, the Kiliwa lie at the historic "center of gravity" for the differentiation of Yuman from Cochimí and of the Yuman branches from each other.

Linguistic prehistorians are not in agreement as to whether the Kiliwa's linguistic ancestors are most likely to have migrated into the Baja California peninsula from the north separately from the ancestors of the Cochimí and the Core Yumans, or whether they became differentiated from those groups in place. The controversial technique of glottochronology suggests that the separation of Kiliwa from Core Yuman may have occurred about 2,000-3,000 years ago.

Phonology

Consonants 

Intervocalic allophones of /p, t, k, kʷ/ can occur as [β, ð, ɣ, ɣʷ]. An approximant sound such as a /j/ sound after a glottal /h/ can become devoiced as [j̊], as with a devoiced [ʍ] sound being an allophone of /hʷ/.

Vowels 
There are three vowel quantities; /i, u, a/, that can also be distinguished with vowel length /iː, uː, aː/. Close vowel sounds /i, u/ can range to mid vowel sounds as [e, o], and with vowel length as [eː, oː]. An epenthetic schwa sound [ə] can occur within root-initial consonant clusters.

Pitch Accents
(1) High level, (2) High-falling level, (3) Low level.

Orthography

Alphabet 
The Kiliwa language is written using a modified Roman alphabet, as the language's culture has historically been unwritten and entirely oral. It consists of 15 consonants which includes 3 digraphs: ⟨b⟩, ⟨ch⟩, ⟨g⟩, ⟨h⟩, ⟨hh⟩, ⟨k⟩, ⟨l⟩, ⟨m⟩, ⟨n⟩, ⟨nh⟩, ⟨p⟩, ⟨s⟩, ⟨t⟩, ⟨w⟩, and ⟨y⟩.

There are also 5 short and 5 long vowels: /a/, /aː/, /e/, /eː/, /i/, /iː/, /o/, /oː/ , /u/, and /uː/. These are represented in the chart below.

Other digraphs used in the Kiliwa language include: gu, hu, and ku. They are shown in the chart below.
{| class="wikitable"
|Digraphs
|Phoneme
|Kiliwa Examples
|English Translation
|-
|

gu
|

/ɡʷ/
|Pagu
Hkuigu
|Rabbit

Hunt
|-
|

hu
|

/hʷ/
|P’huhk’ ii

Mphuh-mi
|Thud

This box/bag
|-
|hu
|

/hʷ/
|Huwaa uJu sawi
|Seat

Clean
|-
|ku
|

/kʷ/
|Hkuigu

Tukuipaai
|To hunt

Animal
|-
|hu
|

|

|

|}
The inclusion of / , / is used as a brief pause, such as that in Spanish.  

 Numbers 
Numbers in Kiliwa can be expressed up to several thousands without the use of Spanish loanwords. Counting is done using both fingers and toes. There is a resemblance of the Kiliwa word ‘sal’ which is the root for ‘finger/hand’. 

The following numbers are formed by using the form for the ten's place 'chipam' followed by its multiplier digit (the digits of those listed above from 1-9).

The hundreds are formed by using the expression ‘chipam msig u’ kun yuu chipam’ followed by the multiplier digits found in that of numbers 1-9.

Lastly, the thousands are formed by using the expression ‘chipam msig u’ kuetet’ before using the multiplier digits once again.

 Morphology 
The morphology in the Kiliwa language consists of many affixes and clitics. More of these are available on the verb rather than the noun. These affixes are usually untouched and added on to a modified root.

 Singular and Plurals 
In Kiliwa there are multiple ways of pluralizing words. There are several to differentiate it from the singular form. The most common affixes are t, chau, m, u and si’waa.

There are also some instances in which the plural form changes the vowels, for example: Kill! (Kinyii); Kill them! (Kenyoot); Grab! (Kiyuu); Grab them! (Kiyeewi);  Stand! (Ku'um);  All of you stand! (Ke'ewi).

 Adverbs 
Used in adjectives or nouns to denote a superlative degree of meaning.

Examples:

Other adverbs include: Mgaai (better), Mak (here), Paak (there), Psap mi (today), Hhchoom (yesterday), Kiis i'bm (later), Mat pi’im kun (never) 

Examples:

 Adjective -Tay: something of a big/great size for animals and objects or someone obtains a higher power/status due to profession.

Examples:

Suffix P is used to signify something of a smaller degree for several adjectives.

Examples:

 Conjunctions 
Conjunctions are connect two or more ideas into a single sentence.There are also disjunctive conjunctions to separate two or more mutually exclusive options presented in a sentence.

Examples: /and/ translates in Kiliwa to e'''.

 Verbs 

 Verbs are more complicated than nouns in Kiliwa language 
 There are more verb prefixes present, and fewer suffixes and infixes 
 The prefixes demonstrate more structure within the grammar

 Conjugation of the verbs 
The conjugation allows us to tell what the action is doing and taking place in the verb 

 Example in Kiliwa: Conjugation of Verb Tmaa (eat)

 Past & Present 
Example: "I" presented 

Past 

Future 

 Nouns 
In the Kiliwa language they are marked by the definite and indefinite 

Determiner NP

The Kiliwa has 3 degree of distance that appear in the third person pronoun 

Examples:

 The demonstrative NP 
Kiliwa language is also measured in the independent third-person pronoun in the demonstrative Np 

Examples:

Mi-chau → ‘these;they’ → (near speaker)

paa-chau → ‘those;they → (near hearer)

nyaa-chau → “those;they → (far from both)

mi-t cham ‘This/(s)he leaves (it)’

mi-chau-t caam-u → ‘These/they leave (it)’

m '-saau   ‘I see this one/him/her’

mi-chau=m=juak-m ʔ-cam → ‘I leave with these/them’

mi-chau-l '-saau   ‘I looked into these one/them’

 Gender Markers 
When referring to a male human or animal one adds Kumeei 

When referring to a female human or animal one adds Kökoo 

 Axis 
Example: kumeei is male and kökoo is female 

 Syntax 
Kiliwa is a verb-final language that usually follows the order subject-object-verb. Dependent object clause should be found before the verb, whereas relative or adjectival clauses appear following the noun they modify. While behavioral context, negations, auxiliaries, etc. can alter the placement of certain aspects, the Object-Verb form remains true in most sentences.

Example of transitive sentence in which the structure is simply object-verb: 

Sentences with a negation typically contain the object-verb format, however, basic structure would be subject - pre-verb negative - object - verb - final negative. Example: 

Toponyms
The following Kiliwa toponyms are from the map given in Mixco (2000:70).

Settlements
Ja' Kupan /xaʔ kupan/ - Agua Caliente
Jpi' Kunaan  /xpiʔ kuna:n/ - San Isidro
Mjuaa /mxʷa:/ - Los Coches
Pnyil /pɲil/ - Santo Domingo
Ku'ii Yuwu /kuʔi: yuwuʔ/ - San Quintin
Juiim Ja' /xʷi:m haʔ/ - San Felipe
Ipaa Cha'amui /ipa: t͡ʃaʔamʷi/ - Tijuana
Jua Nyimaat /xʷa: ɲima:t/ - Mexicali
Ja'Tay Juatu' /xaʔtaj xʷatuʔ/ - Ensenada
Yuul Mat /ju:l mat/ - Santa Catarina

Natural features
Ku'ii Yaku' /kuʔiː yakuʔ/ - Salinas
Hiil /hi:l/- Cañón de la Esperanza
Hyaau /hʲa:w/ - San Matías Pass
Kumsalp /kumsalp/ - Colnett Point

Mountains
Mou Weey /mow we:j/ - Cerro Borrego
Nyaay Weey /ɲa:j we:j/ - peak just to the south of Cerro Borrego
Mou Wa' Weey /mow waʔ we:j/ - Cerro Salvatierra
Kaay Spkuin /ka:j spkʷin/ - peak just to the south of Cerro Salvatierra
Mt Waay Walu Weey /mt wa:j walu we:j/ - Picacho de Diablo
Jaal Jak /xa:l xak/ - Sierra de San Pedro Martir
Kunyil Weey /kuɲil we:j/ - Cerro Colorado

Bodies of water
Ja'tay /xaʔtaj/ - Pacific Ocean
Chuwílo Tay /t͡ʃuwilo taj/ - Arroyo Grande
Mat Pchuj /mat pt͡ʃux/ - San José Creek
Msuan /msʷan/ - San Telmo Creek
Jmil /xmil/ - San Rafael River
Ja' Hiil /xaʔ hi:l/ - Colorado River

References

 Mixco, Mauricio J.. 1971. Kiliwa Grammar. Ph.D. dissertation, Department of Linguistics, University of California, Berkeley.
 Mixco, Mauricio J.. 1976. "Kiliwa Texts". International Journal of American Linguistics Native American Text Series 1:92-101.
 Mixco, Mauricio J.. 1977. "The Linguistic Affiliation of the Ñakipa and Yakakwal of Lower California". International Journal of American Linguistics 43:189-200.
 Mixco, Mauricio J.. 1983. Kiliwa Texts: "When I Have Donned My Crest of Stars" University of Utah Anthropological Papers No. 107. (Myths and legends narrated by Rufino Ochurte and Braulio Espinosa after 1966.). Salt Lake City.
 Mixco, Mauricio J.. 1985. Kiliwa Dictionary. University of Utah Anthropological Papers No. 109. Salt Lake City.
 Mixco, Mauricio J.. 1996. Kiliwa de Arroyo León, Baja California. Archivo de Lenguas Indígenas de México No. 18. Mexico City: Colegio de México. 
 Mixco, Mauricio J.. 2000. Kiliwa. Munich, Germany: Lincom.
 Mixco, Mauricio J.. 2006. "The Indigenous Languages". In The Prehistory of Baja California: Advances in the Archaeology of the Forgotten Peninsula, edited by Don Laylander and Jerry D. Moore, pp. 24–41. Gainesville: University Press of Florida.
 Moore, Jerry D.. 2006. "The San Quintín-El Rosario Region". In The Prehistory of Baja California: Advances in the Archaeology of the Forgotten Peninsula, edited by Don Laylander and Jerry D. Moore, pp. 179–195. Gainesville: University Press of Florida.
 Ochoa Zazueta, Jesús Ángel. 1978. Los kiliwa y el mundo se hizo así''. Mexico City: Instituto Nacional Indigenista,

External links

Kiliwa Swadesh vocabulary list (from Wiktionary)
AULEX Spanish-Kiliwa dictionary

Yuman-Cochimi languages
Indigenous languages of the Southwestern United States
Indigenous languages of the North American Southwest
Endangered indigenous languages of the Americas